King Xiang may refer to these rulers of ancient China:

Xiang of Xia (3rd millennium BC), possibly a ruler of the Xia dynasty
King Xiang of Zhou (died 619 BC)
King Xiang of Han (died 296 BC)
King Xiang of Wei (died 296 BC)
King Xiang of Qi (died 265 BC)

See also
Duke Xiang (disambiguation)